Primula cockburniana, called the Cockburnia primrose, is a species of flowering plant in the genus Primula, native to south-central China. A short-lived perennial, it has gained the Royal Horticultural Society's Award of Garden Merit.

References

cockburniana
Flora of South-Central China
Garden plants
Plants described in 1892